Lee Soo-bin (Korean: 이수빈, born January 16, 1939) is the CEO of Samsung Life Insurance.  According to English language wire services, he is "representing Samsung externally", after Samsung Group chairman Lee Kun-hee resigned, on 22 April 2008, as a result of the bribery scandal investigation. He is unrelated to the Lee family of Samsung Group.

References

Living people
1939 births
Samsung people
South Korean businesspeople
South Korean billionaires
Seoul National University alumni
People from North Gyeongsang Province

ko:이수빈